Bureš (feminine Burešová) is a Czech and Slovak surname. Notable people with the name include:

 Dagmar Burešová (1929–2018), Czech lawyer and politician
 Jakub Bureš (born 1981), Czech footballer
 Jaroslav Bureš (born 1954), Czech politician
 Michaela Burešová-Loukotová, Czech rower
 Ondřej Bureš (born 1966), Czech swimmer
 Otomar Bureš, Czech equestrian
 Tomáš Bureš (born 1978), Czech footballer
 Bureš, the StB codename for Andrej Babiš, former prime minister of the Czech Republic

See also 
 Buresch (Germanized form of the surname)
 Buresh (disambiguation) (Americanized form of the surname)

Czech-language surnames